Fabio Roselli (born 13 April 1971, in Rome) is a former Italian rugby union player and a currently is the Head coach of Zebre Parma in United Rugby Championship. He played as a wing.

Roselli played his entire career for Rugby Roma Olimpic, from 1989/90 to 2002/03. He won one Italian Championship, in 1999/2000, and one Cup of Italy, in 1997/98.

He had 16 caps for Italy, from 1995 to 1999, scoring 5 tries, 25 points in aggregate. He played a game at the 1999 Rugby World Cup, in what would be his final cap for his national team.

He was the coach of the Italy National Team U-18, in 2008, and is currently in charge of the Italy National Team U-17.

From 2020 to 2022 he was named Assistant coach for Zebre.

References

External links
Fabio Roselli International Statistics

1971 births
Living people
Italian rugby union players
Italian rugby union coaches
Italy international rugby union players
Rugby union wings